Senad is a Bosnian masculine given name. The name comes from the Arabic word سند meaning "support".
  
People named Senad include:

Senad Bašić (born 1962), Bosnian actor
Senad Brkić (born 1969), former Bosnian footballer
Senad Hadžimusić (born 1957), Bosnian musician
Senad Kreso (born 1955), Bosnian football manager
Senad Lulić (born 1986), Bosnian footballer
Senad Lupić (born 1960), former Bosnian footballer
Senad Podojak (born 1966), Bosnian imam and hafiz
Senad Repuh (born 1972), Bosnian professional football player
Senad Tiganj (born 1975), Slovenian footballer
Senad Vehabović (born 2008), Slovenian bodybuilder

Bosniak masculine given names
Bosnian masculine given names